Loch a' Bhainne is a small, upland freshwater loch approximately  north of the east end of Loch Garry and  north-west of Invergarry in the Scottish Highlands. The loch was surveyed in 1903 by James Murray as part of Sir John Murray's Bathymetrical Survey of Fresh-Water Lochs of Scotland 1897-1909.

References 

a' Bhainne
a' Bhainne